The Portuguese Baseball and Softball Federation (FPBS), is the federation that guides the competitions of baseball and softball in Portugal, with headquarters in Abrantes. It was founded in 1993, but not legally established until February 23, 1996. The influential multi-sport Associação Académica de Coimbra had already formed its baseball team in 1994.

References

External links
Portuguese Baseball and Softball Federation - english version
European Championship Qualifier'08 - english version

Baseball
Portugal
Softball organizations
Sports organizations established in 1996
Softball in Portugal